Bodily functions can refer to one of the following:

 The functions (i.e. processes) of human or animal bodies, called "systems" in physiology.
 A euphemism for urination or defecation
 Bodily Functions (album)
 Skeletal system
 Circulatory system
 Integumentary system
 Immune system
 Nervous system
 Organ system
 Digestive system
 Excretory system